Sebastiano Longo (born 5 January 1998) is an Italian football player. He plays for RG Ticino.

Club career
He made his Serie C debut for Messina on 30 April 2016 in a game against Casertana.

He spent the 2016–17 season on loan at Serie D club Igea Virtus, where he scored 8 goals in 31 games.

On 28 July 2017 he signed with Parma and was assigned to their Under-19 squad.

He joined Paganese on a season-long loan on 31 August 2018. On 20 January 2019, he moved on loan to Potenza. On 14 July 2019, he re-joined Potenza on another loan with an option to buy.

On 30 September 2020, he was loaned to Fano.

On 28 January 2021 he moved on a permanent basis to Casertana.

On 11 October 2021, he moved to RG Ticino in Serie D.

References

External links
 

1998 births
People from Barcellona Pozzo di Gotto
Sportspeople from the Province of Messina
Living people
Italian footballers
Association football forwards
A.C.R. Messina players
Parma Calcio 1913 players
Paganese Calcio 1926 players
Potenza Calcio players
Alma Juventus Fano 1906 players
Casertana F.C. players
Serie C players
Serie D players
Footballers from Sicily